PA4 may refer to:
 ALCO PA-4, a diesel locomotive
 Paranormal Activity 4
 Pennsylvania Route 4
 Pennsylvania's 4th congressional district
 Pitcairn PA-4 Fleetwing II, a biplane
 PA4 paper; see Paper size
 The PA4, a type of rolling stock used on the PATH train in New York and New Jersey